Tain District is one of the twelve districts in Bono Region, Ghana. Originally it was formerly part of the then-larger Wenchi District on 10 March 1989; until the western part of the district was split off to create Tain District on 12 November 2003 (effectively 17 February 2004); thus the remaining part has been retained as Wenchi District (which it was later upgraded to municipal district assembly status and has been renamed as Wenchi Municipal District on 29 February 2008). Later, the northern part of the district was split off to create Banda District on 28 June 2012; thus the remaining part has been retained as Tain District. The district assembly is located in the northeast part of Bono Region and has Nsawkaw as its capital town.

List of settlements

Sources
 
 District: Tain
 19 New Districts Created, November 20, 2003.

References

2003 establishments in Ghana

Bono Region

Districts of Bono Region